Planning Policy Statement 25, commonly abbreviated as PPS 25, is a document produced by the British Government and intended to set out policy on development and flood risk. PPS25 was published in December 2006 and has been supplemented with a Practice Guide in June 2008.

In Northern Ireland Planning Policy Statement 15: Planning and Flood Risk applies

See also
Planning Policy Statements
Town and country planning in the United Kingdom
Planning and Compulsory Purchase Act 2004
Rivers Agency
Floods directive

References

United Kingdom planning policy